Elastic recoil detection analysis (ERDA), also referred to as forward recoil scattering (or, contextually, spectrometry), is an ion beam analysis technique in materials science to obtain elemental concentration depth profiles in thin films. This technique is known by several different names. These names are listed below. In the technique of ERDA, an energetic ion beam is directed at a sample to be characterized and (as in Rutherford backscattering) there is an elastic nuclear interaction between the ions of beam and the atoms of the target sample. Such interactions are commonly of Coulomb nature. Depending on the kinetics of the ions, cross section area, and the loss of energy of the ions in the matter, ERDA helps determine the quantification of the elemental analysis. It also provides information about the depth profile of the sample.

The incident energetic ions can have a wide range of energy from 2 MeV to 200 MeV. The energy of the beam depends on the sample to be studied. The energy of the beam should be enough to kick out (“recoil”) the atoms of the sample. Thus, ERD usually employs appropriate source and detectors to detect recoiled atoms.

However, such an experimental setup is expensive and along with a source requirement of high-energy ions appears to make this technique relatively less commonly used for materials characterization, but is nevertheless commercially available. Moreover, the angle of incidence that an ion beam makes with the sample must also be taken into account for correct analysis of the sample. This is because, depending on this angle, the recoiled atoms will be collected. Although it is not very clear, the assumption for why this technique is not very well known would be because it is hard to have a perfect combination of the source, the angle of incidence, and the detector to have the best characterization of the sample. Such problem would make the technique very time consuming and tedious.

This article provides information about ERDA that has been around for a long time, since the mid-1970s. The article provides detailed information about the high ion incident ERDA. However, low ion incident ERDA is still not neglected. The comparative analysis of overall ERDA with other techniques such as TEM, AFM, XRR, NR, VASE, XPS, and DSIMS is also mentioned. The article briefly touches upon the history of ERDA but the main focus is on the technique itself. Comprehensive information on the instrumentation as well as its applications in elemental characterization and depth profile are provided.

ERDA and RBS have similar theory but minor differences in the set-up of the experiment. In case of RBS, the detector is placed in the back of the sample whereas in ERDA, the detector is placed in the front.

Comparative Analysis
There are several techniques used today for characterization of materials. Combination of techniques is usually needed in order to obtain correct characterization. When comparing several techniques, important parameters like detection limit, depth resolution and lateral resolution must be taken into account. For this purpose, comparisons of several techniques have been shown in the table below.

Table 1: Comparison of techniques with characteristic properties

Characteristics of ERDA
The main characteristics of ERDA are listed below. 
 A variety of elements can be analyzed simultaneously as long as the atomic number of recoiled ion is smaller than the atomic number of the primary ion.
 The sensitivity of this technique, primarily depending upon scattering cross-section area, and the method has almost equal sensitivity to all light elements. In this case the light element is any element which has atomic number between 2 and 50.
 Depth resolution is depended upon stopping power of heavy ions after interactions with sample, and the detection of scattered primary ions is reduced due to the narrow scattering cone of heavy ions scattering from light elements.
 Gas-ionization detector provides efficient recoil detection and thus minimizes the exposure of sample to the ion beam making this a non-destructive technique. This is important for accurate measurement of hydrogen which is known for its instability and its loss under ion beam irradiation.
Such characteristics have led to many groups and scientists to explore applications of ERDA.

History

ERDA was first demonstrated by L’Ecuyer et al. in 1976. They had used 25-40 MeV 35Cl ions were used to detect the recoils in the sample. After more than three decades, ERDA has been divided into two main groups. First is the Light incident Ion ERDA (LI-ERDA) and the second is the Heavy incident Ion ERDA (HI-ERDA).

LI-ERDA uses low voltage single-ended accelerators, whereas the HI-ERDA uses large tandem accelerators. These techniques were mainly developed after heavy ion accelerators were introduced in the materials research. LI-ERDA is also often performed using a relatively low energy (2 MeV) 4He beam specifically to depth profile hydrogen. In this technique, multiple detectors are used:  at backscattering angles to detect heavier elements by RBS and forward (recoil) detector to simultaneously detect the recoiled hydrogen. The recoil detector for LI-ERDA typically has a “range foil” which is typically a Mylar foil placed in front of the detector for blocking scattered incident ions but allow lighter recoiling target atoms to pass through to the detector. Usually a 10 µm thick Mylar foil is able to completely stop 2.6 MeV He+ ions but allows the recoiled protons to go through with a low energy loss.

HI-ERDA is more widely used compared to LI-ERDA because it can be used to study a lot more variety of elements compared to LI-ERDA. It can be used to identify heavy elements. It is used to detect recoiled target atoms and scattered beam ions using several detectors namely silicon diode detector, time-of-flight detector, gas ionization detector, etc. Such detectors are described below. Main advantage of HI-ERDA is its ability to obtain quantitative depth profiling information of all the sample elements in one measurement. Recent studies have shown that depth resolution obtained by using this technique is excellent. Depth resolution less than 1 nm can be obtained with good quantitative accuracy thus giving these techniques significant advantages over other surface analysis methods. Also, the accessible depth of 300 nm can be achieved using this technique. A wide range of ion beams including 35Cl, 63Cu, 127I, and 197Au, with different energies can be used in this technique in order for recoil to occur.

It must be noted that LI-ERDA and HI-ERDA both provide similar information. The difference in the name of the technique is only due to the type of ion beam used as a source.

The setup and the experimental conditions affect the performances of both of these techniques. Factors such as multiple scattering, and ion beam induced damage must be taken into account before obtaining the data because these processes can affect the data interpretation, quantification and the accuracy of the study. Additionally, the incident angle and the scattered angle help determine the sample surface topography. Incorporating surface topography into Ion Beam Analysis technique, a reliable characterization of layers of a surface can be obtained.

Prominent Features of ERDA
ERDA is very similar to RBS, but instead of detecting the projectile at the back angle, the recoils are detected in the forward direction. Doyle and Peercey in 1979 were able to establish the use of this technique for hydrogen depth profiling. Some of the prominent features of ERDA with high energy heavy ions are: 
 Large recoil cross section with heavy ions provides good sensitivity. Moreover, all chemical elements, including hydrogen, can be detected simultaneously with similar sensitivity and depth resolution.
 Concentrations of 0.1 atomic percent can be easily detected. The sampling depth depends on the sample material and is of the order of 1.5-2.5 µm. For the surface region, a depth resolution of 10 nm can be achieved. The resolution deteriorates, with increasing depth due to several physical processes mainly the energy straggling and multi-scattering of the ions in the sample.
 Same recoil cross section for a wide mass range of target atoms 
 The unique characteristic of this technique is that element depth profiling of a wide range of elements from hydrogen to rare earth elements.

ERDA can overcome some of the limitations of Rutherford backscattering (RBS). ERDA has enabled depth profiling of elements from lightest elements like hydrogen up to heavy elements with high resolution in the light mass region as discussed above. Also, this technique has been highly sensitive because of the use of large area position sensitive telescope detectors This detector is used especially when the elements in the sample have similar masses. Telescope detectors are one way to distinguish such elements in the sample as it becomes extremely difficult to separate the elements using a normal detector.

Principles of ERDA

The calculations that model this process are relatively simple, assuming projectile energy is in the range corresponding to Rutherford scattering. Projectile energy range for light incident ions is in 0.5-3.0 MeV range. For heavier projectile ions such as 127I the energy range is usually between 60-120 MeV; and for medium heavy ion beams,36Cl is a common ion beam used with an energy of approximately 30 MeV. For the instrumentation section, the focus will be on heavy ion bombardment. The E2 transferred by projectile ions of mass m1 and energy E1 to sample atoms of mass m2 recoiling at an angle ϕ, with respect to the incidence direction is given by the following equation.

(1)   

Equation 1 models the energy transfer from the incident ions striking the sample atoms and the recoiling effect of the target atoms with an angle of ϕ. For heavier ions in elastic recoil detection analysis, if m2/m1 <<1, all recoiling ions have similar velocities. It can be deduced from the previous equation the maximum scattering angle, θ’max, as equation 2 describes:

(2)   

Using these parameters, absorber foils do not need to be incorporated into the instrument design. When using heavy ion beams and the parameters above, the geometry can be estimated as to allow for incident particle collision and scattering at an angle deflected away from the detector. This will prevent degradation of the detector from the more intense beam energies.

The differential elastic recoil cross-section σERD is given by:

(3)   

where Z1 and Z2 are the atomic numbers of projectile and sample atoms, respectively. For m2/m1 <<1 and with approximation m=2Z; Z being the atomic number of Z1 and Z2. In equation (3) two essential consequences can be seen, first the sensitivity is roughly the same for all elements and second it has a Z14 dependence on the projector of the ion. This allows for the use of low energy beam currents in HI-ERDA preventing sample degradation and excessive heating of the specimen.

When using heavy ion beams, care must be taken for beam-induced damage in sample such as sputtering or amorphization. If only nuclear interaction is taken into account, it has been shown that the ratio of recoiling to displaced atoms is independent of Z1 and only weakly dependent on the projectile mass of the incident ion. With heavy ion bombardment, it has been shown that the sputter yield by the ion beam on the sample increases for nonmetallic samples and enhanced radiation damage in superconductors. In any case, the acceptance angle of the detector system should be as large as possible to minimize the radiation damage. However, it may reduce the depth profiling and elemental analysis due to the ion beam not being able to penetrate the sample.
 
The figure on the right summarizes the principles of ERDA and how a spectrum is obtained.

This demand of a large acceptance angle, however, is in conflict with the requirement of optimum depth resolution dependency on the detection geometry. In the surface approximation and assuming constant energy loss the depth resolution δx can be written:

(4)   

where Srel is the relative energy loss factor defined by:

(5)   

here, α and β are the incidence angles of the beam and exit angle of the recoiling ion respectively, connected to the scattering angle ϕ by ϕ=α+β. It should be noticed here that the depth resolution depends on the relative energy resolution only, as well as the relative stopping power of incoming and outgoing ions. The detector resolution and energy broadening associated with the measuring geometry contribute to the energy spread, δE. The detector acceptance angle and the finite beam spot size define a scattering angle range δϕ causing a kinematic energy spread δEkin according to equation 6:
  
(6)   

A detailed analysis of the different contributions to depth resolution shows that this kinematic effect is the predominant term near the surface, severely limiting the permitted detector acceptance angle, whereas energy straggling dominates the resolution at larger depth. For example, if one estimates δϕ for a scattering angle of 37.5° causing a kinematic energy shift comparable to typical detector energy resolutions of 1%, the angular spread δψ must be less than 0.4°. The angular spread can be maintained within this range by contributions from the beam spot size; however, the solid angle geometry of the detector is only 0.04 msr. Therefore, a detector system with large solid angle as well as high depth resolution may enable corrections for the kinematic energy shift.

In an elastic scattering event, the kinematics requires that the target atom is recoiled with significant energy. Equation 7 models the recoil kinematical factor that occurs during the ion bombardment.

(7)   

(8)   

(9)   

(10)   

Equation 7 gives a mathematical model of the collision event when the heavier ions in the beam strike the specimen. Ks is termed the kinematical factor for the scattered particle (Eq. 8) with a scattering angle of θ, and the recoiled particle (Eq. 9) with a recoil angle of Φ. The variable r is the ratio of mass of the incident nuclei to that of the mass of the target nuclei, (Eq. 10). To achieve this recoil of particles, the specimen needs to be very thin and the geometries need to be precisely optimized to obtain accurate recoil detection. Since ERD beam intensity can damage the specimen and there has been growing interest to invest in the development of low energy beams for reducing the damage of the specimen.

The cathode is divided into two insulated halves, where particle entrance position is derived from charges induced on the left, l, and right, r, halves of the cathode. Using the following equation, x-coordinates of particle positions, as they enter the detector, can be calculated from charges l and r :

(11)   

Furthermore, the y-coordinate is calculated from the following equation due to the position independence of the anode pulses:

(12)   

For transformation of the (x, y) information into scattering angle ϕ a removable calibration mask in front of the entrance window is used. This mask allows correction for x and y distortions too. For notation detail, the cathode has an ion drift time on the order of a few ms. To prevent ion saturation of the detector, a limit of 1 kHz must be applied to the number of particles entering the detector.

Instrumentation
Elastic Recoil Detection Analysis was originally developed for hydrogen detection or a light element (H, He, Li, C, O, Mg, K) profiling with an absorber foil in front of the energy detector for beam suppression. Using an absorber foil prevents the higher energy ion beam from striking the detector and causing degradation. Absorber foils increase the lifetime of the detector. More advanced techniques have been implemented to negate the use of absorber foils and the associated difficulties that arise through the use of it. In most cases, medium heavy ion beams, typically 36Cl ions, have been used for ERDA so far with energies around 30 MeV. Depth resolution and element profiling of thin films has been greatly advanced using elastic recoil detection analysis. Figure 2, on the left, depicts the interaction of a heavy ion beam striking the sample atoms and the resulting backscattering and recoil ions.

Ion source and interactions

Particle accelerators, such as a magnetron or cyclotron, implement electromagnetic fields to achieve acceleration of elements. Atoms must be electrically charged (ionized) before they can be accelerated. Ionization involves the removal of electrons from the target atoms. A magnetron can be used to produce H- ions. Van de Graaff generators have also been integrated with particle accelerators, shown in figure 3, for light ion beam generation.

For heavier ion production, for example, an electron cyclotron resonance (ECR) source can be used. Figure 4 shows a schematic diagram of an ECR. At the National Superconducting Cyclotron Laboratory, neutral atoms have their electrons removed using an ECR ion source. ECR works by ionizing the vapor of a desired element such as chlorine and iodine.  Further, utilizing this technique metals (Au, Ag, etc.) can also be ionized using a small oven to achieve a vapor phase. The vapor is maintained within a magnetic field long enough for the atoms to be ionized by collisions with electrons. Microwaves are applied to the chamber as to keep the electrons in motion.

The vapor is introduced via injection directly into the “magnetic bottle” or the magnetic field. Circular coils provide the shape for the magnetic bottle. The coils are found at the top and bottom of the chamber with a hexapole magnet around the sides. A hexapole magnet consists of permanent magnets or superconducting coils. The plasma is contained within the magnetic trap that is formed from electric current flowing in solenoids located on the sides of the chamber. A radial magnetic field, exerted by the hexapole magnetic, is applied to the system that also confines the plasma. Acceleration of the electrons is achieved using resonance. For this to occur, the electrons must pass through a resonance zone. In this zone, their gyrofrequency or cyclotron frequency is equal to the frequency of the microwave injected into the plasma chamber. Cyclotron frequency is defined as the frequency of a charged particle moving perpendicular to the direction of a uniform magnetic field B. Since the motion is always circular, cyclotron frequency-ω in radians/second-can be described by the following equation:

(13)    = ω

where m is the mass of the particle, its charge is q, and the velocity is v. Ionization is a step-by-step process from collisions of the accelerated electrons with the desired vapor atoms. The gyrofrequency of an electron is calculated to be 1.76x107 Brad/second.

Now that the vapor of the desired has been ionized, they must be removed from the magnetic bottle. To do this, a high voltage is between the hexapoles applied to pull out the ions from the magnetic field. The extraction of the ions, from the chamber, is carried out using an electrode system through a hole in a positively biased plasma chamber. Once the ions have been extracted from the chamber, they are then sent to the cyclotron for acceleration.
It is very important that the ion source used is optimal for the experiment being carried out. To perform an experiment in a practical amount of time, the ions provided from the accelerator complex should have the correct desired energy. The quality and stability of the ion beam needs to be considered carefully, due to the fact that only the ions with the correct flight trajectory can be injected in the cyclotron and accelerated to the desired energy.

During ERDA, the idea is to place an ion beam source at a grazing angle to the sample. In this set up, the angle is calculated as to allow the incident ions to scatter off of the sample so that there is no contact made with the detector. The physical basis that has given the method its name stems from the elastic scattering of incident ions on a sample surface and detecting the recoiling sample atoms while the incident ions backscatter at such an angle, that they do not reach the detector; this is typically in reflection geometry, illustrated in figure shown:

Another method for preventing incident ions from making contact with the detector is to use an absorber foil. During analysis of the elastically recoiled particles, an absorber foil with selected specific thickness can be used to "stop" the heavy recoil and beam ions from reaching the detector; reducing the background noise. Incorporating an absorber into the experimental set up can be the most difficult to achieve. The stopping of the beam using either direct or scattered methods can only be accomplished without also stopping the light impurity atoms, if it is heavier (beam ions) than the impurity atoms being analyzed. There are advantages when using absorber films:

1) The large beam Z1 gives rise to a large Rutherford cross section and because of the kinematics of heavy-on-light collisions that cross section is nearly independent of the target, if M1>> M2 and M ~2Z; this helps in reducing the background.
2) The higher stopping power provides a good depth resolution of  ~300 Angstroms, limited in fact by straggling in the absorber.

The major criterion for absorber foils used in ERDA is whether a recoiling impurity atom can be transmitted through the absorber, preferably a commercially available metal foil, while stopping heavy particles. Since the lighter atoms leave the absorber with smaller energies, the kinematic calculations do not provide much help. Favorable results have been obtained by using heavier ion beams of approximately 1 MeV/ nucleon. The best overall candidate is the 35Cl ion beam; although, 79Br would give better sensitivity by one order of magnitude compared to the 35Cl ion beam. The mass resolution, of the detector at θ= 0°, of thin samples is ΔM/Δx ~ 0.3 amu/1000 Angstroms of the profile width. With thick samples, the mass resolution is feasible at θ≤30°. In thicker samples there is some degradation of mass resolution and slight loss of sensitivity. The detector solid angle has to be closed, but the thick sample can take more current without heating, which decreases sample degradation.

Detectors
Once the ion beam has ionized target sample atoms, the sample ions are recoiled toward the detector. The beam ions are scattered at an angle that does not permit them to reach the detector. The sample ions pass through an entrance window of the detector, and depending on the type of detector used, the signal is converted into a spectrum.

Silicon diode detector
In elastic recoil detection analysis, a silicon diode is the most common detector. This type of detector is commonly used, however, there are some major disadvantages when using this type of detector. For example, the energy resolution decreases significantly with a Si detector when detecting heavy recoiled ions. There is also a possibility of damage to the detector by radiation exposure. These detectors have a short functional lifetime (5–10 years) when doing heavy ion analysis. One of the main advantages of silicon detectors is their simplicity. However, they have to be used with a so-called “range foil” to range out the forward scattered heavy beam ions. Therefore, the simple range foil ERD has two major disadvantages: first, the loss of energy resolution due to the energy straggle and second, thickness inhomogeneity of the range foil, and the intrinsic indistinguishability of the signals for the various different recoiled target elements. Aside from the listed disadvantages, ERDA range foils with silicon detectors is still a powerful method and is relatively simple to work with.

Time of flight detector
Another method of detection for ERDA is time of flight (TOF)-ERD. This method does not present the same issues, as those for the silicon detector. However, the throughput of TOF detectors is limited; the detection is performed in a serial fashion (one ion in the detector at a time). The longer the TOF for ions, the better the time resolution (equivalent to energy resolution) will be. TOF spectrometers that have an incorporated solid state detector must be confined to small solid angles. When performing HI-ERDA, TOF detectors are often used and/or ∆E/E detectors-such as ionization chambers. These types of detectors usually implement small solid angles for higher depth resolution. Figure 6, on the left, shows a Time-of-Flight detector commonly used in ERDA. Heavier ions have a longer flight time than the lighter ions. Detectors in modern time-of-flight instruments have improved sensitivity, temporal and spatial resolution, and lifetimes. Hi mass bipolar (high mass ion detection), Gen 2 Ultra Fast (twice as fast as traditional detectors), and High temperature (operated up to 150 °C) TOF are just a few of the commercially available detectors integrated with time-of-flight instruments. Linear and reflectron-TOF are the more common instruments used.

Ionization detector
A third type of detector is the gas ionization detector. The gas ionization detectors have some advantages over silicon detectors, for example, they are completely impervious to beam damage, since the gas can be replenished continuously. Nuclear experiments with large area ionization chambers increase the particle and position resolution have been used for many years and can easily be assimilated to any specific geometry. The limiting factor on energy resolution using this type of detector is the entrance window, which needs to be strong enough to withstand the atmospheric pressure of the gas, 20-90 mbar. Ultra-thin silicon nitride windows have been introduced, together with dramatic simplifications in the design, which have been demonstrated to be nearly as good as more complex designs for low energy ERD. These detectors have also been implemented in heavy ion Rutherford Backscattering Spectrometry. Figure 7 shows the Gas Ionization chamber with Isobutane as the detector gas. 

The energy resolution obtained from this detector is better than a silicon detector when using ion beams heavier than helium ions. There are various designs of ionization detectors but a general schematic of the detector consists of a transversal field ionization chamber with a Frisch grid positioned between anode and cathode electrodes. The anode is subdivided into two plates separated by a specific distance. From the anode, signals ∆E(energy lost), Erest(residual energy after loss), and Etot (the total energy Etot= ΔΕ+Erest) as well as the atomic number Z can be deduced. For this specific design, the gas used was isobutane at pressures of 20-90 mbar with a flow rate that was electronically controlled, the previous figure. A polypropylene foil was used as the entrance window. It has to be noted that the foil thickness homogeneity is of more importance for the detector energy resolution than the absolute thickness. If heavy ions are used and detected, the effect of energy loss straggling will be easily surpassed by the energy loss variation, which is a direct consequence of different foil thicknesses. The cathode electrode is divided in two insulated halves, thus information of particle entrance position is derived from charges induced at the right and left halves.

ERDA and energy detection of recoiled sample atoms
ERDA in transmission geometry, where only the energy of the recoiling sample atoms is measured, was extensively used for contamination analysis of target foils for nuclear physics experiments. This technique is excellent for discerning different contaminants of foils used in sensitive experiments, such as carbon contamination. Using 127I ion beam, a profile of various elements can be obtained and the amount of contamination can be determined. High levels of carbon contamination could be associated with beam excursions on the support, such as a graphite support. This could be corrected by using a different support material. Using a Mo support, the carbon content could be reduced from 20-100 at.% to 1-2 at.% level of the oxygen contamination probably originating from residual gas components. For nuclear experiments, high carbon contamination would result in extremely high background and the experimental results would be skewed or less differentiable with the background. With ERDA and heavy ion projectiles, valuable information can be obtained on the light element content of thin foils even if only the energy of the recoils is measured.

ERDA and particle identification
Generally, the energy spectra of different recoil elements overlap due to finite sample thickness, therefore particle identification is necessary to separate the contributions of different elements. Common examples of analysis are thin films of TiNxOy-Cu and BaBiKO. TiNxOy-Cu films were developed at the University of Munich and are used as tandem solar absorbers. Figure 8 shows the various components to the film. The copper coating and the glass substrate was also identified. Not only is ERDA is also coupled to Rutherford backscattering spectrometry, which is a similar process to ERDA. Using a solid angle of 7.5 mrs, recoils can be detected for this specific analysis of TiNxOy-Cu. It is important when designing an experiment to always consider the geometry of the system as to achieve recoil detection. In this geometry and with Cu being the heaviest component of the sample, according to eq. 2, scattered projectiles could not reach the detector. To prevent pileup of signals from these recoiled ions, a limit of 500 Hz needed to be set on the count rate of ΔΕ pulses. This corresponded to beam currents of lass than 20 particle pA.

Another example of thin film analysis is of BaBiKO. This type of film showed superconductivity at one of the highest-temperatures for oxide superconductors. Elemental analysis, shown in figure 9, of this film was carried out using heavy ion-ERDA.  These elemental constituents of the polymer film (Bi, K, Mg, O, along with carbon contamination) were detected using an ionization chamber. Other than Potassium, the lighter elements are clearly separated in the matrix. From the matrix, there is evidence of a strong carbon contamination within the film. Some films showed a 1:1 ratio of K to carbon contamination. For this specific film analysis, the source for contamination was traced to an oil diffusion pump and replaced with an oil-free pumping system.

ERDA and position resolution
In the above examples, the main focus was identification of constituent particles found in thin films and depth resolution was of less significance. Depth resolution is of great importance in applications when a profile of a sample's elemental composition, in different sample layers, has to be measured. This is a powerful tool for materials characterization. Being able to quantify elemental concentration in sub-surface layers can provide a great deal of information pertaining to chemical properties. High sensitivity, i.e. large detector solid angle, can be combined with high depth resolution only if the related kinematic energy shift is compensated.

Physical Processes of Elastic Recoil Detection Analysis

The Basic chemistry of Forward recoil scattering process is considered to be charged particle interaction with matters.
To Understand Forward recoil spectrometry we should know the physics involved in Elastic and Inelastic collisions. In Elastic collision only Kinetic Energy is conserved in the scattering process and there is no role of particle internal energy. Where as in case of 
Inelastic collision both kinetic energy and internal energy are participated in the scattering process.
Physical concepts of two-body elastic scattering are the basis of several nuclear methods for elemental material characterization.

Fundamentals of Recoil (Back Scattering) Spectrometry

The Fundamental aspects in dealing with recoil spectroscopy involves electron back scattering process of matter such as thin films and solid materials. Energy loss of particles in target materials is evaluated by assuming that the target sample is laterally uniform and constituted by a mono isotopic element. This allows a simple relationship between that of penetration depth profile and elastic scattering yield

Main assumptions in physical concepts of Back scattering spectrometry

 Elastic collision between two bodies is the energy transfer from a projectile to a target molecule. This process depends on the concept of kinematics and mass perceptibility.
 Probability of occurrence of collision provides information about scattering cross section.
 Average loss of energy of an atom moving through a dense medium gives idea on stopping cross section and capability of depth perception.
 Statistical fluctuations caused by the energy loss of an atom while moving through a dense medium. This process leads to the concept of energy straggling and a limitation to the ultimate depth and mass resolution in back scattering spectroscopy.

Physical concepts that are highly important in interpretation of forward recoil spectrum are depth profile, energy straggling, and multiple scattering.  These concepts are described in detail in the following sections :

Depth profile and Resolution analysis

A key parameter that characterizes recoil spectrometry is the depth resolution. This parameter is defined as the ability of an analytical technique to measure a variation in atomic distribution as a function of depth in a sample layer.

In terms of low energy forward recoil spectrometry, hydrogen and deuterium depth profiling can be expressed in a mathematical notation.

Δx  = ΔEtotal/(dEdet/dx)

where δEdet defines as the energy width of a channel in a multichannel analyzer, and dEdet/dx is the effective stopping power of the recoiled particles.

Consider an Incoming and outgoing ion beams that are calculated as a function of collisional depth, by considering two trajectories are in a plane perpendicular to target surface, and incoming and outgoing paths are the shortest possible ones for a given collision depth and given scattering and recoil angles .

Impinging ions reach the surface, making an angle θ1, with the inward-pointing normal to the surface. After collision their velocity makes an angle θ1, with the outward surface normal; and the atom initially at rest recoils, making an angle θ1, with this normal. Detection is possible at one of these angles as such that the particle crosses the target surface.
Paths of particles are related to collisional depth x, measured along a normal to the surface.

This Figure is plane representation of a scattered projectile on the target surface, when both incoming and outgoing paths are in perpendicular to target surface

For the impinging ion, length of the incoming path L1 is given by :

The outgoing path length L2 of the scattered projectile is :

And finally the outgoing path L3 of the recoil is :

This Figure is plane representation of a Recoiled ion path on the target surface, when both incoming and outgoing paths are in perpendicular to target surface

In this simple case a collisional plane is perpendicular to the target surface, the scattering angle of the impinging ion is θ = π-θ1-θ2 & the recoil angle is φ =  π-θ1-θ3.

Target angle with the collisional plane is taken as α, and path is augmented by a factor of 1/cos α.

For the purpose of converting outgoing particle in to collision depth, geometrical factors are chosen.

For recoil R(φ, α)is defined as sin L3 = R(φ, α)L1

For forward scattering of the projectile R(φ,α)by:L2 = R(θ,α)L1
R(θ,α) = cos θ1cosα/Sin θ√(cos2α-cos2θ1)-cosθ1cosθ

The Figure below is the Geometrical configuration of recoil spectrometry. Paths of scattered particles are considered to be L1 for incident beam, L2 is for scattered particle, and L3 is for recoiled atoms.

Energy Depth Relationship

The energy E0(x) of the incident particle at a depth (x) to its initial energy E0 where scattering occurs is given by the following Equations. (Tirira. J., 1996)

similarly Energy expression for scattered particle is:

and for recoil atom is:

The energy loss per unit path is usually defined as stopping power and it is represented by :

Specifically, stopping power S(E) is known as a function of the energy E of an ion.

Starting point for energy loss calculations is illustrated by the expression:

By applying above equation and energy conservation Illustrates expressions in 3 cases 

where E01(x)= KE0(x)and E02(x)=K'E0(x)

S(E)and S_r(E) are stopping powers for projectile and recoil in the Target material

Finally stopping cross section is defined by ɛ(E)= S(E)/N
 
ɛ is stopping cross section factor.

To obtain energy path scale We need to evaluate energy variation δE2 of the outgoing beam of energy E2 from the target surface for an increment δx of collisional depth, here E0 remains fixed. Evidently this causes changes in path lengths L1 and L3 a variation of path around the collision point x is related to the corresponding variation in energy before scattering :

δL1 =  δE0(x)/S[E0(x)-----  Equation 5

Moreover, particles with slight energy differences after scattering from a depth x undergo slight energy losses on their outgoing path.
Then change δ L3 of the path length L3 can be written as 
δL3 =  δ(K’E0(x)]/ Sr[K’E0(x)) + δ(E2)/SrE2) -----Equation 6

δ L1 is the path variations due to energy variation just after the collision and  δ L3 is the path variation because of variation of energy loss along the outward path.
Solving equations 5 and 6 by considering δ x = 0 for the derivative dL1/dE2 with L3=R(φα)L1,yields

dL1/dE2 = 1/{Sr(E2)/Sr[K’E0(x)]}{[R(φ,α) Sr[K’E0(x)+K’S[E0(x)]}  -----------Equation 7

In elastic spectrometry, the term[S] is called as energy loss factor
[S] =   K’S(E(x))/Cos θ1 + Sr(K’E(x))2Cos θ2 -----------------Equation 8

finally stopping cross section is defined by ε(E) ≡S(E)/N
where N is atomic density of the target material.

Stopping cross section factor [ε]  = ((K^'ε(E(x) ))/cos θ1 )+(εr(K^' E(x) )/cosθ3)--------Equation 9

Depth Resolution

An important parameter that characterizes recoil spectrometer is depth resolution. It is defined as the ability of an analytical technique to detect a variation in atomic distribution as a function of depth. The capability to separate in energy in the recoil system arising from small depth intervals. The expression for depth resolution is given as

δRx = δET/[{Sr(E2)/SrK'E0(x)}][R(φ,α)SrK'E0(x)+K'SE0(x)]-----------Equation 10

Where δET is the total energy resolution of the system, and the huge expression in the denominator is the sum of the path integrals of initial, scattered and recoil ion beams.

Practical importance Of Depth Resolution

The concept of depth resolution represents the ability of Recoil spectrometry to separate the energies of scattered particles that occurred at slightly different depths
δRx is interpreted as an absolute limit for determining concentration profile. From this point of view concentration profile separated by a depth interval of the order of magnitude of δRx would be undistinguishable in the spectrum, and obviously it is impossible to gain accuracy better than δRx to assign depth profile. In particular the fact that the signals corresponding to features of the concentration profile separated by less than δRx strongly overlap in the spectrum.

A finite final depth resolution resulting from both theoretical and experimental limitations has deviation from exact result when consider an ideal situation. Final resolution is not coincide with theoretical evaluation such as the classical depth resolution δRx precisely because it results from three terms that escape from theoretical estimations: 
 
Incertitude due to approximations of energy spread among molecules.
Inconsistency in data on stopping powers and cross section values
Statistical fluctuations of recoil yield (counting noise)

Influence of Energy Broadening on a Recoil spectrum

Straggling: Energy loss of particle in a dense medium is statistical in nature due to a large number of individual collisions between the particle and sample. Thus the evolution of an initially mono energetic and mono directional beam leads to dispersion of energy and direction. The resulting statistical energy distribution or deviation from initial energy is called energy straggling. Energy straggling data are plotted as a function of depth in the material.

Theories of energy straggling : Energy straggling distribution is divided into three domains depending on the ratio of ΔE i.e., ΔE /E where ΔE is the mean energy loss and E is the average energy of the particle along the trajectory.

1. Low fraction of energy loss: for very thin films with small path lengths, where ΔE/E ≤ 0.01, Landau and Vavilov   derived that infrequent single collisions with large energy transfers contributes certain amount of loss in energy.

2. Medium fraction of energy loss: for regions where 0.01< ΔE/E ≤ 0.2. Bohr’s model based on electronic interactions is useful for estimating energy straggling for this case, and this model includes the amount of energy straggling in terms of the areal density of electrons traversed by the beam. 
The standard deviation Ω2B of the energy distribution is given by : Ω2B=4π((Z1e2)2NZ2∆x
Where NZ2Δx is the number of electrons per unit area over the path length increment Δx.

3. Large fraction of energy loss: for fractional energy loss in the region of 0.2< ΔE/E ≤ 0.8, the energy dependence of stopping power causes the energy loss distribution to differ from Bohr’s straggling function. Hence the Bohr theory can not be applicable for this case.   Various theoretical advances were made in understanding energy straggling in this case.
An expression of energy for straggling is proposed by Symon in the region of 0.2< ΔE/E ≤ 0.5 is a function of momentums Mi( Mi = M1+M2 where M1 is stopping power, M2 is variation in straggling with depth of a stopping power)

Tschalar et al.   derived a straggling function solving the differential equation:
d Ω2/dx = S(E) .d Ω2/dE

The Tschalar’s expression which is valid for nearly symmetrical energy loss spectra, is
Ω2 T = S2[E(x)]σ2(E) dE/S3(E)

Where σ2(E) represents energy straggling per unit length (or) variance of energy loss distribution per unit length for particles of energy E. E(x)is the mean energy at depth x.

Mass resolution

In a similar way mass resolution is a parameter that characterizes the capability of recoil spectrometry to separate two signals arising from two neighboring elements in the target. The difference in the energy δE2 of recoil atoms after collision when two types of atoms differ in their masses by a quantity  δM2   is

δE2/ δM2 = E0 (dK’/dM2)

δE2/ δM2 = 4E0(M1(M1-M2)cos2φ/(M1+M2)2

Mass resolution  δMR  (≡ δE2/ δM2).

A main limitation of using low beam energies is the reduced mass resolution. The energy separation of different masses is, in fact, directly proportional to the incident energy. The mass resolution is limited by the relative E and velocity v.

Expression for mass resolution is   ΔM = √(∂M/∂E.∆E)2 + √(∂M/∂v.∆v)2

ΔM = M(√((∆E)/E)2+√(2.∆v/v)2)

E is the Energy, M is the mass and v is the velocity of the particle beam.and ΔM is reduced mass difference.

Multiple scattering scheme in Forward Recoil Spectrometry

When an Ion beam penetrating in to matter, ions undergo successive scattering events and deviates from original direction. The beam of ions in initial stage are well collimated(single direction), but after passing through a thickness of Δx in a random medium their direction of light propagation certainly differs from normal direction . As a result, both angular and lateral deviations from the initial direction can occur. These two parameters are discussed below. Hence, path length will be increased than expected causing fluctuations in ion beam. This process is called multiple scattering, and it is statistical in nature due to the large number of collisions.

Lateral displacement Case 1

Ion beam fluctuations because of lateral deviations on Target surface is explained by considering Multiple scattering of an ion beam which is directed in x – direction.

Angular deviation Case 2

In the below figure there is a considerable difference between in the shape area of Gaussian peak (ideal condition) and angularly deviated peak.  and α is an angle due to angular deviation of a penetrated ion beam through matter.

Theory and Experimental work involved in Multiple Scattering phenomena

In the study of Multiple Scattering phenomenon angular distribution of a beam is important quantity for Consideration. The lateral distribution is closely related to the angular one but secondary to it, since lateral displacement is a consequence of angular divergence. Lateral distribution represents the beam profile in the matter.  both lateral and angular Multiple scattering distributions are interdependent.

The analysis of Multiple Scattering was started by Bothe(Bothe, W,1921) and Wentzel (Wentzel, G,1922)in the Nineteen twenties using well-known approximation of small angles. The physics of energy straggling and Multiple Scattering was developed quite far by Williams from 1929 to 1945. Williams devised a theory, which consists of fitting the Multiple Scattering distribution as a Gaussian-like portion due to small scattering angles and the single collision tail due to the large angles. William, E.J., studied beta particle straggling, Multiple scattering of fast electrons and alpha particles, and cloud curvature tracks due to scattering to explain Multiple scattering in different scenario and he proposed a mean projection deflection occurrence due to scattering. His theory later extended to multiple scattering of alpha particles.
Goudsmit and Saunderson provided a more complete treatment of Multiple Scattering, including large angles.  For large angles Goudsmit considered series of Legendre polynomials which are numerically evaluated for distribution of scattering. The angular distribution from Coulomb scattering has been studied in detail by Molière.,(Molière:1948) and further continued by Marion and coworkers. Marion, J.B., and Young, F.C., in their Nuclear Reaction Analysis provided Tabular information regarding energy loss of charged particles in matter, Multiple scattering of charged particles, Range straggling of protons, deuterons and alpha particles, equilibrium charge states of ions in solids and energies of elastically scattered particles.  Scott presents a complete review of basic theory, Mathematical methods, as well as results and applications.
A comparative development of Multiple Scattering at small angles is presented by Meyer, based on a classical calculation of single cross section.  Sigmund and Winterbon reevaluated Meyer’s calculation to extend it to a more general case. Marwick and Sigmund carried out development on lateral spreading by Multiple Scattering, which resulted in a simple scaling relation with the angular distribution.

Applications
HI-ERDA and LI-ERDA have similar applications. As mentioned previously, the only difference between the two techniques is energy of the source used for the bombardment of the sample.

ERDA, in general, has many applications in the areas of polymer science, material science – semiconductor materials, electronics, and thin film characterization. ERDA is widely used in polymer science.  This is because polymers are hydrogen-rich materials which can be easily studied by LI-ERDA. One can examine surface properties of polymers, polymer blends and evolution of polymer composition induced by irradiation. HI-ERDA can also be used in the field of new materials processed for microelectronics and opto-electronic applications. Moreover, elemental analysis and depth profiling in thin film can also be performed using ERDA.

An example of how ERDA can be used by scientists is shown below. In one of the experiments performed by Compsoto, et al., ERDA spectrum was obtained for a thin film of polystyrene (PS) on a deuterated polystyrene (dPS) matrix after annealing for 240 seconds at 171 °C. This spectrum is shown in figure 16 on the left.

It must be noted that the plot above is simply the normalized yield at each channel number from a thin dPS layer (about 200 Angstroms) on top of a thick PS. Normalized yield is usually the number of atoms detected. Channeling, however occurs when a beam of ions is carefully aligned with a major symmetry direction of a single crystal, such as a crystal axis or a plane. In this condition, most of the beam is steered through the channels formed by the string of atoms. Channeled particles cannot get close enough to the atomic nuclei to undergo scattering.  Several mathematical operations were then performed, electronically, to obtain a concentration versus depth-profile as shown below in figure 17. Please refer to the source for detailed explanation of the mathematical equations.

In addition to all these applications, ERDA is one of the methods to follow elemental transport mechanism. More importantly, hydrogen transport near interfaces induced by corrosion and wear can be probed using ERDA. ERDA can also be used to perform composition diagnosis in various media.

Characterizing how polymer molecules behave at free polymer surfaces at interfaces between incompatible polymers and at interfaces with inorganic solid substances is crucial to our fundamental understanding and for improving the performance of polymers in high-tech applications. For example, the adhesion of two polymers strongly depends on the interactions occurring at the interface, between polymer segments. LI-ERDA is one of the most attractive methods for investigating these aspects of polymer science quantitatively.

A typical LI- ERDA spectrum obtained using this technique to study elemental concentration and depth profile of polymers is shown in the figure 18 below. It is ERDA spectra of a thin (20 nm) dPS tracer film on a thick (500 nm) PS matrix.

Hydrogen and deuterium profiles can be measured using various polymer blends by using this technique. Green and Russel  have studied the segregation of deuterated polystyrene/polymethamethacrylate copolymer at the interface of polystyrene, and polymethylmethacrylate homopolymer at the interface of polystyrene and polymethylmetacrylate homopolymer using ERDA with 2.8 MeV 4He+ ions. They also studied the interface properties of copolymers/Al or Si structures. Figure 19 shows the results obtained which is a typical ERD spectrum of yield vs. energy of P(d-S-b-d-MMA) block copolymer chains that segregated at the interface of the PS and PMMA homopolymers.

This profile can then be converted to volume fraction versus depth after doing several mathematical operations to obtain figure 20. In the figure 20 shown, the shaded region is the interface excess. The PS phase is located at x<0 whereas the PMMA phase is located at x>0. Please refer to the source to obtain complete analysis of the figure.

Thus the authors were able to see that copolymer chains segregate to the interfacial region between the PS and PMMA homolymer phases and elevated temperatures while others remain in bulk. Similar studies can be easily done using the technique of ERDA

The profile that lies in the energy range between 600 and 1000 keV is the hydrogen from the homopolymers and the other profile, which lies between 1000 and 1400 keV, is that of the deuterium from the copolymer chains.

Ion implantation is one of the methods used to transform physical properties of polymers and to improve their electrical, optical, and mechanical performance. Ion implantation is a technique by which the ions of a material are accelerated in an electrical field and impacted into a materials such that ion are inserted into this material. This technique has many important uses. One such example is the introduction of silver plasma into the biomedical titanium. This is important because Titanium-based implantable devices such as joint prostheses, fracture fixation devices and dental implants, are important to human lives and improvement of the life quality of patients. However, biomedical titanium is lack of Osseo integration and antibacterium ability. Plasma immersion ion implantation (PIII) is a physical technique which can enhance the multi-functionality, mechanical and chemical properties as well as biological activities of artificial implants and biomedical devices. ERDA can be used to study this phenomenon very effectively. Moreover, many scientists have measured the evolution of electrical conductivity, optical transparency, corrosion resistance, and wear resistance of different polymers after irradiation by electron or low-energy light ions or high-energy heavy ions.

Electronic devices are usually composed of sequential thin layers made up of oxides, nitrides, silicades, metals, polymers, or doped semiconductor–based media coated on a single crystalline substrate (Si, Ge or AsGa). These structures can be studied by HI-ERDA. This technique has one major advantage over other methods.  The profile of impurities can be found in a one-shot measurement at a constant incident energy. Moreover, this technique offers an opportunity to study the density profiles of hydrogen, carbon and oxygen in various materials, as well as the absolute hydrogen, carbon and oxygen content.

Combination of techniques is required in order to study the composition of thin films. Ion beam techniques – RBS and elastic recoil detection analysis combination has proved to be an attractive way to study the elemental composition of the samples as well as the depth profiles of the thin films. ERDA technique is capable of separating masses and energies of scattered incident ions and the recoiled target atoms. It is especially useful to profile light elements such as H, B, C, N, and O in the presence of heavier material background. Thus it has proved to be a useful technique in studying the composition of the thin films. The dependence of the hydrogen density profile on the features of processing and maintenance, and the effect of injected hydrogen on the dielectric properties of ditantalum pentoxide can also be studied.

Synonyms and acronyms
 ERD = Elastic Recoil Detection
 ERDA = Elastic Recoil Detection Analysis
 FRS = Forward Recoil Spectrometry
 FReS = Forward Recoil Spectrometry
 HFS = Hydrogen Forward Scattering

References 

Materials science